The 2018–19 Louisiana Tech Lady Techsters basketball team represented Louisiana Tech University during the 2018–19 NCAA Division I women's basketball season. The Lady Techsters, led by third year co-head coaches Brooke Stoehr and Scott Stoehr, played their home games at Thomas Assembly Center and were members of Conference USA. They finished the season 14–16, 6–10 in C-USA play to finish in tenth place. They lost in the first round of the C-USA women's tournament to Charlotte.

Roster

Schedule

|-
!colspan=9 style=| Non-conference regular season

|-
!colspan=9 style=| Conference USA regular season

|-
!colspan=9 style=| Conference USA Women's Tournament

See also
2018–19 Louisiana Tech Bulldogs basketball team

References

Louisiana Tech Lady Techsters basketball seasons
Louisiana Tech
Louisiana Tech
Louisiana Tech